The Gift of Christmas is fifth studio album and the Christmas album by American female recording group En Vogue, released on October 8, 2002 by Discretion Enterprises following their departure from Elektra Records. Produced and arranged by long time collaborators Thomas McElroy and Denzil Foster, featuring additional production by Timothy Eaton, it is the group's first Christmas album and their only record to feature vocals from Amanda Cole who remained two years with the group. The Gift of Christmas features original Christmas tunes as well as cover versions of classic holiday songs.

Background 
In 2000, En Vogue released their fourth studio album Masterpiece Theatre, their second project as a trio following the departure of original member Dawn Robinson in 1997. A commercial disappointment, the album debuted and peaked at number 33 on the US Billboard Top R&B/Hip-Hop Albums chart and at number 67 on the Billboard 200. This marked En Vogue's lowest peak for an album by then and was a considerable drop from their previous effort EV3 (1997). "Riddle," the album's only single, also failed to impact, resulting in the release of no further singles after Elektra Records refused to release the album’s second single, "Love U Crazay"." Instead, En Vogue were soon dropped from Elektra after the weak commercial performance of the project.

In 2001, Amanda Cole was added as a performing member to the band, but soon after original member Maxine Jones announced her desire to spend more time with her young daughter and departed, leaving them as a trio again. Around the same time, produced Timothy Eaton approached the band when he was interested in doing a Christmas album with them through Discretion Records. While Eaton and David Sterling served as executive producers on the album, En Vogue reteamed with their founders, production duo Foster & McElroy, to record the album, featuring four original songs and eight cover versions of Christmas standards and carols. In 2017, when asked about its creation process, Cindy Herron commented that "the album was sort of, I don't want to say it was an experiment, but in a way it was."

Track listing

Personnel

Cindy Herron Briggs - lead and backing vocals
Terry Ellis - lead and backing vocals
Amanda Cole - lead and backing vocals
Big Baby - string arrangements
Jamie Brewer - bass
Tracy Arrington - bass
Mark Welling - drums
Howard Mostrum - engineer
Tony Woods – composer, drum programming, keyboard programming
Jillian Baskerville – choir, chorus
Geraldine P. Andrews – choir, chorus
Timothy Eaton – arranger, choir conductor, executive producer, producer
Ben Arrindell - remix, engineer, mixing
Steve Counter – engineer, mixer 
Denzil Foster – composer, drum programming, keyboard programming, producer
Thomas McElroy – composer, drum programming, keyboard programming, producer
Denzil Foster - producer
Thomas McElroy - producer
Timothy Eaton - producer

References

External links
En Vogue - "The Gift of Christmas" CD

2002 Christmas albums
En Vogue albums
Christmas albums by American artists
Pop Christmas albums
Contemporary R&B Christmas albums